Vellappallam is a village located between Velankanni and Vedaranyam in Nagapattinam district in the Indian state of Tamil Nadu.

Demographics
As of 2001 India census, Vellappallam had a population of 3,728. Males constitute 48% of the population and females 52%. The literacy rate is 61%, higher than the national average of 59.5%. Male literacy is 64%, and female literacy is 59%. In Vellappallam, 11% of the population is under 6 years of age. Peoples living from different religion of Hindu, and Christian and different innercast in each religion. East side of the village is surrounded by East Bay of Bengal and other sides are lands. This village is in Thalaignayar panchayat. This village was affected by the tsunami. More than 20 people were killed.

Education
Two Elementary and one Higher Secondary school owned by the village. In elementary school more than 300 students studying. Only one Higher Secondary school running for more than four nearest villages and nearly 1500 students are studying. The main occupation of this village is agriculture and fishing. The primary occupation is agriculture (80%), fishing (10%). Other 10% of the peoples working as educated professionals like Teachers, Engineers, Banking etc.

Places of interest
Athangarai Muthu Marriyamman Temple
Kanchiyappar Temple
Marriyamman, Pidariamman Temple

References
Census Commission of India; Census of India 2001: Data from the 2001 Census, including cities, villages and towns. Retrieved on 2007-09-03.

Villages in Nagapattinam district